JGU may refer to:
 Jatiya Ganamukti Union, a Bangladeshi political party
 Johannes Gutenberg University of Mainz, in Germany
 John Garang Memorial University, in Bor, South Sudan
 O. P. Jindal Global University, in Sonipat, Haryana, India